The D Sixth Avenue Express is a rapid transit service in the B Division of the New York City Subway. Its route emblem, or "bullet", is colored , since it uses the IND Sixth Avenue Line in Manhattan.

The D operates at all times between 205th Street in Norwood, Bronx, and Stillwell Avenue in Coney Island, Brooklyn via Grand Concourse in the Bronx, Central Park West and Sixth Avenue in Manhattan, the north side of the Manhattan Bridge, and Fourth Avenue and West End in Brooklyn.

During daytime hours, the D runs express between 145th Street in Manhattan and 36th Street–Fourth Avenue in Brooklyn and local elsewhere. During rush hours in the peak direction, the D also runs express between Fordham Road in the Bronx and 145th Street in Manhattan. Overnight D service is only express in Manhattan and local elsewhere.

In its early years, the D ran to World Trade Center in Lower Manhattan via the lower IND Eighth Avenue Line. From 1954 to 1967, the D ran via the IND Culver Line to Coney Island. With the completion of the Chrystie Street Connection, service was rerouted via the BMT Brighton Line, running there from 1967 to 2001. A short-lived  D service ran via the BMT Broadway Line in Manhattan to the Brighton Line in Brooklyn, while  D service used the Sixth Avenue, Central Park West, and Concourse Lines in Manhattan and the Bronx.

History

Early history 

D service began on December 15, 1940, when the IND Sixth Avenue Line opened. It ran from 205th Street, the Bronx to World Trade Center (at that time called Hudson Terminal) on the IND Eighth Avenue Line at all times, switching between the IND Sixth Avenue to the Eighth Avenue Lines just south of West Fourth Street–Washington Square. Service ran express via the Concourse Line during rush hours. Two trains started service at Bedford Park Boulevard in the morning rush hour.

D service was increased on October 24, 1949, in order to offset the discontinuation of C service, which ran express via the Concourse Line and the Eighth Avenue Line. After the morning rush hour on weekdays, several D trains terminated at Bedford Park Boulevard. On December 29, 1951, Saturday peak direction express service in the Bronx was discontinued, along with the discontinuation of Saturday CC local service.

On October 30, 1954, the Culver Ramp, a connection between the IND South Brooklyn Line and BMT Culver Line opened. D service was rerouted via these two lines to Coney Island–Stillwell Avenue with alternate trains running to Church Avenue during rush hours. On Saturdays, four round trips ran between 205th Street and Kings Highway. D trains replaced F service on the South Brooklyn Line, and were sent over the new connection as the first IND service to reach Coney Island. The service was announced as Concourse–Culver and advertised as direct Bronx–Coney Island service.

On May 13, 1957, alternate D trains were cut back to Church Avenue during weekday middays. Between October 7, 1957, and 1959, four rush hour trains ran to Euclid Avenue via the IND Fulton Street Line when the D started being inspected at Pitkin Yard. Four trains left 205th Street between 7:20 and 8:10 a.m., and one left Bedford Park Boulevard at 8:53 a.m. These four trains returned between 3 and 5 p.m. During the morning rush hour, several northbound trains ended at Bedford Park Boulevard. These trains ran express along the Fulton Street Line if they ran during the hour that A trains ran express during the line.

From December 4 to 27, 1962, a special service labeled DD was provided due to a water main break. It ran local from 205th Street, Bronx to 59th Street–Columbus Circle, then continued as a local down the Eighth Avenue Line to West Fourth Street, where it switched to the Sixth Avenue Line and continued on its normal route to Coney Island–Stillwell Avenue via the Culver Line.

Chrystie Street 

On November 26, 1967, the Chrystie Street Connection opened, connecting the Sixth Avenue Line with the north tracks of the Manhattan Bridge and the BMT Southern Division lines in Brooklyn. In conjunction with this project, the new express tracks on the Sixth Avenue Line between West Fourth Street–Washington Square and 34th Street were opened, providing additional capacity for the extra trains on the IND via the connection. On this date, D service was switched over to BMT Brighton Line via this new connector, running express on weekdays to Brighton Beach and local to Stillwell Avenue at all other times. The D replaced Q service, which had run local in Brooklyn (except during morning rush hours and early evenings) and express on the BMT Broadway Line in Manhattan, terminating at 57th Street. In Manhattan, it ran express from West 4th Street to 34th Street rush hours only, with the  using the express tracks to relay when it terminated at West 4th Street at other times. Service on the Culver Line to Coney Island was replaced by extended F service. On July 1, 1968, it would become the full-time Sixth Avenue Express when non-rush hours  service and new KK service was extended to the new 57th Street–Sixth Avenue station.

On August 19, 1968, to reduce conflicts at the Brighton Beach terminal, D service was truncated to Brighton Beach when it ran express on the BMT Brighton Line (morning rush hours through early evenings, and QB (rush-hour peak direction only) and QJ (morning rush hours through early evenings) were extended from Brighton Beach to Coney Island–Stillwell Avenue. In addition, the span of Manhattan-bound D express service was increased by two hours, with the last express leaving Brighton Beach at 7:37 p.m. 

Effective January 2, 1973, the daytime QJ was truncated to Broad Street as the J, and the M was extended beyond Broad Street during the day along the QJ's former route to Coney Island–Stillwell Avenue, via the Montague Street Tunnel and Brighton Line local tracks. Also, changes were made to D and M service on the Brighton Line. Northbound weekday M train service originating at Kings Highway would begin at 5:46 a.m., while northbound service from Coney Island would begin at 6:34 a.m. From 5:40 to 6:34 a.m. northbound D trains would run local from Brighton Beach to Kings Highway, and then run express to Prospect Park. Late morning and early afternoon D trains would from then on run express from Brighton Beach to Kings Highway. The span of D express service to Brighton Beach was extended by 45 minutes to 9:05 p.m. from Prospect Park, and the span of M service from Broad Street to Coney Island was extended by 45 minutes over the span of QJ service to cover local stops.

Rehabilitation work 

D service was divided and ran in two sections when the north tracks of the Manhattan Bridge closed on April 26, 1986, due to construction, with regular service expected to resume on October 26, 1986. The northern section ran between Norwood–205th Street in the Bronx and 34th Street–Herald Square (the orange D) while the southern section ran from 57th Street–Seventh Avenue on the BMT Broadway Line, then express along the Broadway Line to Canal Street, then over the south tracks of the Manhattan Bridge into Brooklyn, and then along the Brighton Line to Stillwell Avenue (the yellow D). Service to Grand Street was replaced by the S shuttle, which ran via the Sixth Avenue local to 57th Street–Sixth Avenue. 

At this time, the local tracks on the BMT Brighton Line also underwent reconstruction, necessitating the suspension of express service. As a substitute, the D and Q ran skip-stop service between Newkirk Avenue and Sheepshead Bay on weekdays. D trains served Neck Road, Avenue M and Avenue H; the Q skipped those stops, serving Avenue U and Avenue J, while both trains served Kings Highway. The first skip-stop train left Brighton Beach at about 6:30 a.m. while the last one left 57th Street–Seventh Avenue at about 7:30 p.m. On weekday evenings, between 8 p.m. and 1 a.m., D trains made all local stops, except Parkside Avenue and Beverley Road where service was only available in one direction. During late nights and weekends, D trains ran express between Prospect Park and Kings Highway depending on which tracks were being worked on. By 1987, as reconstruction on the Brighton Line progressed, the weekday skip-stop pattern expanded to Prospect Park, with D trains serving Beverley Road while Q trains served Cortelyou Road and Parkside Avenue, with Church Avenue as a mutual station.

On December 11, 1988, the north tracks of the Manhattan Bridge reopened and the two sections of the D joined together running via Sixth Avenue Express. The D now ran as the full-time Brighton Local to Stillwell Avenue.

From April 30 to November 12, 1995, the Bridge's north tracks closed during middays and weekends and during these hours, D service was cut south of 34th Street-Herald Square. In its place, the Q ran local in Brooklyn to Stillwell Avenue. On July 22, 2001, the north tracks were closed at all times and the southern (Broadway Line) tracks reopened. D service was again cut below 34th Street–Herald Square. In Brooklyn, D service was replaced by  local service.

After September 11, 2001,  service was suspended. On weekends, the D ran local on Central Park West north of 59th Street to fill in the gap in service caused by the suspension until September 21.

The D was moved to the West End Line instead of returning to the Brighton Line, which it had run on since 1967, to provide 24-hour service to both the Concourse Line and West End Line and avoid running two separate (B and D) shortened services outside of weekdays. This eliminated the need to run late-night and weekend shuttles on the West End Line as was done prior to 2002.

From May 24, 2004, to fall 2004, signal modernization on the IND Concourse Line required the suspension of D express service in the Bronx. 

From September 18, 2021, until January 24, 2022, southbound D trains terminated at Bay 50th Street so work could be completed to protect Coney Island Yard from flooding. 

The IND Concourse Line's express track was closed starting in July 2nd, 2022, with D trains using the local tracks at all times. The express track was reopened on January 23, 2023.

In popular culture 

 Bob Dylan's 1966 song "Visions of Johanna" includes the lyric "And the all-night girls, they whisper of escapades out on the D train." At the time, the D used the IND Culver Line to Coney Island.
 Biz Markie's song "Pickin' Boogers" from his debut album Goin' Off features the line "I was chillin one day/with my partner Kane/headed up to the rooftop/ridin' the D train."
 The opening track on Yoko Ono's 2009 album Between My Head and the Sky is titled "Waiting for the D Train". The D passes through 72nd Street (opposite her apartment in the Dakota Building) but never stops there, as it is a local station.
 Beginning in the late 1980s, numerous Top 10 Lists on Late Night with David Letterman contained references to the D train as a punchline theme.
 The service is mentioned in the song "Boogie Down "by Man Parrish Ft. Freeze Force (MC John Ski) raps the following line: "You take the D to 205th Then go see me 'cause I got the gift And I'm the cool MC with the vicious sounds I'm not from the Bronx, but I still Boogie Down".
 The service is mentioned in the song "3 The Hard Way" by Beastie Boys. Adam Yauch raps the following line: "Used to ride the D to beat the morning bell at Edward R. Murrow out on Avenue L..." (Referring to Edward R. Murrow High School, where the D served the station closest to the school, Avenue M, until 2001, when it was replaced by the ).
 The service is mentioned twice in the song "Stop That Train" by the Beastie Boys. Mike D and Adrock rap the following line: "Same faces every day, but you don't know their names, party people going places on the D train". Adam Yauch raps the following line: "Groggy-eyed and fried, and I'm headed for the station, D train ride to Coney Island vacation."
 The eponymous character of Seinfeld uses the D train to go to Coney Island in the episode "The Subway".
 The 1980s folk-pop trio The Washington Squares includes a song titled "D Train" on their eponymous 1987 debut album.
 Type O Negative refer to the D train as the chosen transport to Brighton Beach, where lead singer Peter Steele will kill his girlfriend in their songs "Xero Tolerance," "Hey Pete", and "Kill You Tonight".
 It is also mentioned in an episode of The Penguins of Madagascar called "Gone In A Flash" where the penguins go to rescue Maurice and have to travel through the subway system. Also, in episode "Dr. Blowhole's Revenge", when Julien is kidnapped by the lobsters, Mort starts his travel to save him by using the metro until Coney Island.
 The D train is the setting of the Amazon Prime series Riding The D With Dr. Seeds.
 Man Against Crime episode "Third Rail" (S4E19) starring Ralph Bellamy was filmed on the D train and at the 207th Street Yard in 1953.
 Jean-Michel Basquiat generated much interest in his graffiti art, which took the form of spray-painted aphorisms that were targeted at the D train.
 Joji's 2015 single "Thom" refers to the line in the lyric - "I take the D train to go to BK", referencing the service to Brooklyn, where he resides as of 2018

Route

Service pattern 
The following table shows the lines used by the D, with shaded boxes indicating the route at the specified times:

Stations 

For a more detailed station listing, see the articles on the lines listed above.

Notes

References

External links 
 
 MTA NYC Transit – D Sixth Avenue Express
 
 

New York City Subway services